Fyodor Zabelin (born 27 May 1888, date of death unknown) was a Russian gymnast. He competed in the men's artistic individual all-around event at the 1912 Summer Olympics.

References

1888 births
Year of death missing
Russian male artistic gymnasts
Olympic gymnasts of Russia
Gymnasts at the 1912 Summer Olympics
Gymnasts from Saint Petersburg